Our Leading Citizen is a 1922 American silent comedy film directed by Alfred E. Green and written by George Ade and Waldemar Young. The film stars Thomas Meighan, Lois Wilson, William P. Carleton, Theodore Roberts, Guy Oliver, Larry Wheat, and James Neill. The film was released on June 14, 1922, by Paramount Pictures.

The film is now lost.

Cast 
Thomas Meighan as Daniel Bentley
Lois Wilson as Katherine Fendle
William P. Carleton as Oglesby Fendle
Theodore Roberts as Colonel Sam De Mott
Guy Oliver	as Cale Higginson
Larry Wheat as J. Sylvester Dubley
James Neill as Honorable Cyrus Blagdon
Lucien Littlefield as The Editor
Charles Stanton Ogle as The Judge
Tom Kennedy as Boots
Sylvia Ashton as Mrs. Brazey
Ethel Wales as Eudora Mawdle

References

External links 

 
 

1922 films
1920s English-language films
Silent American comedy films
1922 comedy films
Paramount Pictures films
Films directed by Alfred E. Green
American black-and-white films
Lost American films
American silent feature films
1922 lost films
Lost comedy films
1920s American films